Aaron Stevens is an American college baseball coach and former third baseman. He played college baseball at Nicholls State for coach Mike Knight from 1985 to 1988. He then served as the head coach of the Mississippi Valley State Devils (2015–2021)

Early life
Stevens attended Lanier High School in Jackson, Mississippi. Stevens then accepted a scholarship to attend Nicholls State University.

Coaching career
After 14 seasons as an assistant at Mississippi Valley State University, Stevens was promoted to head coach on December 2, 2014. On the heels of back-to-back win-less seasons in 2020 and 2021, Stevens was not retained for the 2022 season.

Head coaching record

References

External links
Mississippi Valley State Delta Devils bio

Living people
Nicholls Colonels baseball players
Mississippi Valley State Delta Devils baseball coaches
Year of birth missing (living people)
African-American baseball coaches
Sportspeople from Jackson, Mississippi
Baseball coaches from Mississippi